Worn Stories is a 2021 docuseries released on Netflix on April 1, 2021, starring Spirit Avedon, Timmy Cappello and Diane.

Cast 

 Spirit Avedon
 Tim Cappello
 Diane
 Simon Doonan
 Patrice Jetter
 Aya Kanai
 Joann Matarazzo
 Emily Spivack
 Todd Bailey
 Daisy Cortes
 Emilie Lemakis
 Joe Passon
 Paul
 Shoham
 Ramadhan Sindi
 Marcy Spivack
 Heevi Abdullah
 Mike Africa Jr.
 Ian Chillag
 Jose Cortes
 Liandra
 Niecey Peace
 Frederica Wilson
 Debbie Africa
 Guadalupe Cortes
 Michael Massimino
 Mrs. Park
 Shivon
 Byron Wackwitz
 Antwan Williams
 Matt Caprioli
 Carlos Cervantes
 Zelda Fassler
 Maxayn Gooden
 Mazzerati
 Tom W. Turcich
 Tren'ness Woods-Black
 Rachael Baker
 Charo
 Ernie Glam
 David Pomeranz
 Savannah
 Amir Campbell
 Sal Gonzalez
 Skye Dee Miles
 T.J. Newton
 Tom S. Turcich
 Ron Decar
 Hot Fries
 Ross Intelisano
 Rudy
 Cathy Turcich
 Annaleigh
 Ben Bostic
 Stan
 Mike Africa
 Heidi Vanderhoof

Episodes

References

External links
 
 

2021 American television series debuts
2021 American television series endings
2020s American documentary television series
English-language Netflix original programming
Netflix original documentary television series
Works about fashion